Michael Russell was the defending champion, but he chose to compete at the French Open instead.Donald Young defeated 6–4, 6–4 Robert Kendrick in the final.

Seeds

Draw

Finals

Top half

Bottom half

References
 Main Draw
 Qualifying Draw

2010 ATP Challenger Tour
2010 Singles